The knockout stage of the 2006–07 UEFA Champions League began on 20 February 2007 and culminated with the final match at the Olympic Stadium in Athens on 23 May.

Times are CET/CEST, as listed by UEFA (local times are in parentheses).

Format
The draw for the first knockout round took place on 15 December 2006 and involved each of the top two teams from each group in the group stage. The winners of each group were paired up with the runners-up from another group.

Each knockout round tie consisted of two-legged matches, home and away, in which the team with the higher aggregate score progressed to the next round, with the exception of the final, which was played over just one match at a neutral venue. In the event that the two teams' aggregate scores were tied, the team that scored more goals in their away leg progressed to the next round, with extra time and a penalty shoot-out being used if the tie was still level.

Qualified teams

Bracket

Round of 16

|}

First leg

Second leg

Chelsea won 3–2 on aggregate.

2–2 on aggregate; Liverpool won on away goals.

Roma won 2–0 on aggregate.

2–2 on aggregate; Valencia won on away goals.

PSV Eindhoven won 2–1 on aggregate.

4–4 on aggregate; Bayern Munich won on away goals.

Manchester United won 2–0 on aggregate.

Milan won 1–0 on aggregate.

Quarter-finals

|}

First leg

Second leg

Manchester United won 8–3 on aggregate.

Chelsea won 3–2 on aggregate.

Milan won 4–2 on aggregate.

Liverpool won 4–0 on aggregate.

Semi-finals

|}

First leg

Second leg

1–1 on aggregate; Liverpool won on penalties.

Milan won 5–3 on aggregate.

Final

Notes

External links
2006–07 UEFA Champions League

Knockout Stage
2006-07